August 20, 1955 Stadium, or Stade 20 Août 1955 in French, or ملعب 20 أوت 1955 in Arabic, may refer to the following stadiums in Algeria:
August 20, 1955 Stadium (Algiers)
August 20, 1955 Stadium (Béchar)
August 20, 1955 Stadium (Bordj Bou Arréridj)
August 20, 1955 Stadium (Skikda)